CICC can represent any of the following:

 Cebu International Convention Center, a convention center in Mandaue City, Cebu, Philippines
 China International Capital Corporation Limited, an investment banking firm in China
 CICC-TV, a CTV television station in Yorkton, Saskatchewan, Canada
 Coalition for the International Criminal Court, Civil society in 150 countries advocating for a fair, effective and independent International Criminal Court
 Cook Islands Christian Church, the largest religious denomination in the Cook Islands
 Copenhagen International Choreography Competition, a choreography competition in Copenhagen, Denmark
 Cork Islamic Cultural Centre, a religious organization in Ireland
 Custom Integrated Circuits Conference, a yearly academic conference, sponsored by the IEEE, devoted to advances in integrated circuits